The Black Sea and Caspian Squadron,   also known as the Black Sea and Marmora Force and the Black Sea and Marmora Division, was a naval formation of the British Mediterranean Fleet from 1918 to 1919.

History
On 19 December 1918 the Commander-in-Chief, Mediterranean Fleet instructed Rear-Admiral Michael Culme-Seymour, then commanding British Aegean Squadron, that he was to be re-assigned to a new command appointment. On 1 January he transferred his current command to Commodore Maurice Fitzmaurice and assumed authority for the Black Sea, Caspian Sea, Sea of Azov and Sea of Marmora. The squadron was involved in the Allied intervention in the Russian Civil War. In October 1919 Rear-Admiral Seymour was appointed Second-in-Command, Mediterranean Fleet, and the squadron was disbanded.

A component of the squadron was the British Caspian Flotilla.

Rear-Admirals, commanding
Post holders included:

Components
As of December 1918 included:

References

Sources
 Admiralty, Great Britain (October 1919). "Flag Officers in Commission". Navy List. London England: HM Stationery Office. 
 Halpern, Paul (2016). The Mediterranean Fleet, 1919–1929. Cambridge England: Routledge. .
 Harley, Simon; Lovell, Tony (5 September 2018). "H.M.S. Heliotrope (1915) - The Dreadnought Project". www.dreadnoughtproject.org.
 Watson, Dr Graham (2015). "Royal Navy Organisation and Ship Deployment, Inter-War Years 1914-1918: Mediterranean Fleet". www.naval-history.net. Gordon Smith. 

Royal Navy squadrons
Military units and formations established in 1918
Military units and formations disestablished in 1919